Donna the Buffalo is a band from Trumansburg, New York. It plays both original songs and cover versions.

A musician friend suggested "Dawn of the Buffalo" as a name for the band, which was misheard as "Donna the Buffalo" and, over thirty years later, the band is still called "Donna the Buffalo". The followers of the group are called The Herd, a self-organized "tribe" of people who found each other at the group's live events.

Donna the Buffalo is one of the founding and host bands of the annual Finger Lakes GrassRoots Festival of Music and Dance, and of the Shakori Hills Grassroots Festival; and is among the headliners at The Great Blue Heron Music Festival in Sherman, New York. The band was featured in On The Bus, a documentary co-directed by Dave Sale.

The band has performed and recorded with a variety of musicians, including such prominent folk/roots performers as Jim Lauderdale, the father and son zydeco musicians Preston and Keith Frank, Bela Fleck of Bela Fleck and the Flecktones, the Malian musician Mamadou Diabate, Claire Lynch, David Hidalgo of Los Lobos, The Duhks and Amy Helm. In 2009, Tara Nevins toured with the former Grateful Dead drummer Bill Kreutzmann and his band, BK3.

Members 
Tara Nevins - vocals, acoustic guitar, fiddle, accordion, washboard, occasional backing vocals, tambourine
Jeb Puryear - electric guitar, vocals, occasional pedal steel, rare backup vocals
Chris English - drums
David McCracken - electric keyboard, organ
Ted Pecchio - electric bass guitar

Nevins and Puryear do most of the songwriting.

Past band members include:
Keyboards: Joe Thrift, Richie Stearns, Kathy Ziegler and Sam Fribush
Drums: Mark Raudabaugh, Vic Stafford, Tom Gilbert, Shane Lamphier and Jimmy Triplett
Guitar and frequent vocalist: Jim Miller
Bass guitar: Bill Reynolds, Kyle Spark, Jay Sanders, Jordon Puryear and Jed Greenberg.

Discography 
The White Tape (1989)
The Red Tape (1991)
Donna the Buffalo (a.k.a. The Purple One) (1993)
The Ones You Love (1996)
Rockin' In the Weary Land (1998)
Positive Friction (2000)
Live From the American Ballroom (2001)
Life's A Ride (2005)
Silverlined (2008)
Tonight, Tomorrow and Yesterday (2013)
Dance in the Street (2018)

References

External links
Band official website
Donna the Buffalo Internet Archive
Donna Fans official website
The Donna Base: Search lyrics of all Donna the Buffalo songs, and live shows

Jam bands
Musical groups from New York (state)
Musical groups established in 1989
21st-century American singers
Singer-songwriters from New York (state)